Renya Katarine Ramirez (born 1959) is a Ho-Chunk American anthropologist, author, and Native feminist. She is a professor of anthropology at University of California, Santa Cruz. Ramirez has written 2 books on Native American culture.

Early life and education 
Reyna K. Ramirez was born in 1959 to Woesha Cloud North and Robert Carver. She has 3 sisters and a brother. She is the youngest granddaughter of prominent Native American leaders Elizabeth Bender Roe Cloud and Henry Roe Cloud. Ramirez is an enrolled member of the Winnebago Tribe of Nebraska. She completed a Ph.D. at Stanford Graduate School of Education in 1999. Her dissertation was titled, Healing through grief: Native Americans re-imagining, culture, community and citizenship in San Jose, California. Ramirez's doctoral advisor was Renato Rosaldo.

Career 
Ramirez is a professor of anthropology at University of California, Santa Cruz. She is a Native feminist scholar. Ramirez is the executive producer, co-producer, screenwriter, and co-director of the film, Standing in the Place of Fear: Legacy of Henry Roe Cloud.

Personal life 
Ramirez is married to Gil and has a daughter and 2 sons.

Selected works

References 

Living people
Place of birth missing (living people)
21st-century American women writers
21st-century American anthropologists
American women anthropologists
Native American women academics
American women academics
Native American academics
Native American anthropologists
University of California, Santa Cruz faculty
American feminist writers
Native American feminists
Native American women writers
Winnebago Tribe of Nebraska
American people of Ojibwe descent
Stanford Graduate School of Education alumni
1959 births
Cloud family